Herbert Fitzgibbon (born July 14, 1942) is a former tennis player who was nationally ranked in the 1960s and 1970s.

Fitzgibbon played four years of high school tennis for Garden City High School and never lost a match. He played collegiate tennis at Princeton University and was a gold and bronze medalist at the Olympic Games in Mexico City in 1968 when tennis was a demonstration sport.

Fitzgibbon won the singles title at the tournament in Cincinnati, Ohio in 1964 and was a two-time singles runner-up (1965 and 1963) there as well. He also reached the Cincinnati doubles final with Butch Newman in 1965.  That year, he also won the Long Island Championships and the Eastern Clay Court title. In 1968, Fitzgibbon won against 16th-seeded Nikola Pilić in the first round at Wimbledon, 3–6, 7–5, 6–3, 6–2. The same year he won the La Coruna International in Spain against Juan Gisbert Sr..

Fitzgibbon also was an accomplished platform tennis player, winning national doubles titles in 1974 with John Beck and in 1977 and 1978 with Hank Irvine. In 1974, Fitzgibbon and Beck defeated Keith Jennings and Chauncey Steele III 7–5, 4–6, 6–2, 4–6, 6–2. In 1977, Fitzgibbon and Irvine defeated Gordon Gray and Doug Russell 6–3, 7–5, 1–6, 6–4. Fitzgibbon and Irvine also played in the 1980 National Championship final losing to Steve Baird and Rich Maier 6–1, 3–6, 7–6, 6–7, 6–3

Fitzgibbon authored the book The Complete Racquet Sports Player.

References

External links
 
 
 Official website of the American Platform Tennis Association

1942 births
Living people
American male tennis players
People from Garden City, New York
Platform tennis players
Princeton Tigers men's tennis players
Tennis people from New York (state)
Tennis players at the 1968 Summer Olympics
Pan American Games medalists in tennis
Pan American Games silver medalists for the United States
Tennis players at the 1967 Pan American Games
Garden City High School (New York) alumni
Medalists at the 1967 Pan American Games